Rolando Reátegui Flores (born 19 May 1959) is a Peruvian entrepreneur and Fujimorist politician who is a former Congressman representing San Martín between 2006 and 2019. He was previously a Congressman between 2000 and 2001, elected under the Peru 2000 coalition. He was also Provincial Mayor of San Martín from 1996 to 1998.

Early life and education 
Reátegui was born on 19 May 1959 in Tarapoto and graduated from the University of the Pacific with a license in economics, in 1987.

Business career 
In 1991, he opened his own drugstore in Tarapoto, which he still owns and manages and which has developed into a chain of supermarkets since 1998. Moreover, he manages a farm in Peruvian High Amazonia. From 1994 to 1995, he was the president of the chamber of commerce.

Political career

Early political career 
From 1994 to 2000, Reátegui was the provincial chairman of the political movement IDEAS. In 1995, he was elected as mayor of San Martín Province for a three-year term and served from 1996 to 1998. From 1998 to 2002, he was the secretary-general of the Vamos Vecino party, close to then-president Alberto Fujimori.

Congressman 
In 2000, he was elected Congressman under the Fujimorist Peru 2000 coalition for the 2000–2005 term however, the Congress was dissolved early in 2001 due to Fujimori's resignation and Reátegui ran for re-election representing the San Martín Region under the People's Solution alliance, but he lost his seat. In 2006, he ran for Congress once again, this time on the Alliance for the Future coalition, representing the San Martín Region and was elected to Congress, after a five-year absence. He was re-elected for another five-year term, in 2011, under the Force 2011 party, and again in 2016 for another five-year term, now sitting with the Popular Force party however, he quit the party in January 2019, and his term was cut short in 2019, following to the dissolution of the congress by President Martin Vizcarra.

References

External links

Official Congressional Site

Fujimorista politicians
Living people
Members of the Congress of the Republic of Peru
Peruvian businesspeople
1959 births
People from Tarapoto
University of the Pacific (Peru) alumni
Mayors of places in Peru